Roudouallec is a commune in the Morbihan department of Brittany in north-western France. Inhabitants of Roudouallec are called in French Roudouallecois.

Geography

The village lies on the southern slope of the Montagnes Noires (french, Black mountains).

Neighboring communes

Roudouallec is border by Gourin to the east, by Guiscriff and Scaër to the south, by Leuhan and Saint-Goazec to the west and by Spézet to the north.

Map

Population

Roudouallec's population peaked at 1,656 in 1911 and declined to 705 in 2019. This represents a 57.4% decrease in total population since the peak census figure.

History

Nicolas Le Grand, tailor born in Roudouallec in 1852 emigrated in 1881 to the United States. He was followed by other inhabitants.

See also
Communes of the Morbihan department
Entry on sculptor of local war memorial Jean Joncourt

References

External links

 Mayors of Morbihan Association 

Communes of Morbihan